Unitas may refer to:

 306 Unitas, a main belt asteroid 
 UNITAS, a multi-lateral naval exercise in South and Central America
 Unitas Capital, a private equity firm, formerly known as CCMP Capital Asia
 Humani generis unitas, a planned encyclical of Pope Pius XI before his death on February 10, 1939, which condemned antisemitism, racism and the persecution of Jews.
 Johnny Unitas (1933-2002), professional American football player
 Unitas (mollusc), a genus in family Cancellariidae
 Housing complex Unitas, an apartment complex from 1931 in Bratislava